Charles Mound is a gentle,  high hill located in Scales Mound Township, Jo Daviess County, Illinois, United States. Despite its name, Charles Mound is a naturally occurring, erosional feature and is not to be confused with the intentional mounds created by native cultures. It is the highest natural point in the state and is thus considered a state highpoint. It is the lowest state highpoint in the Midwestern region of the United States.

Geography

Charles Mound is the highest natural point in Illinois. (The highest point is the Willis Tower, formerly known as the Sears Tower.) It is within the  Driftless Area, a region of Illinois, Iowa, Minnesota, and Wisconsin that was not covered or ground down by the last continental glaciers. The hill itself is an erosional remnant, similar to that on which the original village site of Scales Mound was located. Shallow Elizabeth silt loam soil is on the summit and the surrounding area has deeper silty clay loam of the Lacrescent series.

Settlement
Elijah Charles, one of the region's first permanent settlers, arrived in 1828 and settled at the base of the mound and the hill assumed his name.

Access
Charles Mound is located on rolling farmland. The land owners, Jean and Wayne Wuebbels, allow public access on the first full weekends of the months of June, July, August, and September.

See also
 
 
 
 List of U.S. states by elevation

References

External links

 
 

Driftless Area
Highest points of U.S. states
Hills of the United States
Landforms of Illinois
Landforms of Jo Daviess County, Illinois